The 1968 SMU Mustangs football team represented Southern Methodist University (SMU) as a member of the Southwest Conference (SWC) during the 1968 NCAA University Division football season. Led by seventh-year head coach Hayden Fry, the Mustangs compiled an overall record of 8–3 with a conference mark of 5–2, placing third in the SWC. SMU was invited to the Astro-Bluebonnet Bowl, where they upset number 10 Oklahoma Oklahoma.

Schedule

Roster

Team players drafted into the NFL

Awards and honors
 Chuck Hixson, Sammy Baugh Trophy

References

SMU
SMU Mustangs football seasons
Bluebonnet Bowl champion seasons
SMU Mustangs football